Tom Butters may refer to:
 Tom Butters (athletic director) (1938–2016), American college sports administrator and baseball pitcher
 Tom Butters (politician) (1925–2015), Canadian legislator

See also
 Butters (surname)